Ultron is a supervillain appearing in American comic books published by Marvel Comics. Created by writer Roy Thomas and artist John Buscema, the character first appeared as an unnamed character in The Avengers #54 (July 1968), with his first full appearance in The Avengers #55 (August 1968). He is a self-aware and highly intelligent artificial intelligence who develops a god complex and a grudge against his creator Hank Pym. His goal to destroy humanity in a shortsighted attempt at creating world peace has brought him into repeated conflict with the Avengers. Stories often end in Ultron's apparent destruction, only for the character to be resurrected in new forms. 

Ultron's physical body is made of a durable alloy, and he has manifested various superpowers. These vary between different stories but generally include superhuman strength, speed, and agility, flight, and energy projection. The character usually operates alone or accompanied by legions of copies of his own robotic form known as Ultron Drones. However, Ultron has also been part of several supervillain teams. Ultron is notable for being the first character in Marvel Comics to wield the fictional metal alloy adamantium and for his (in-story) creation of the Vision.

Debuting in the Silver Age of Comic Books, Ultron has since featured in Marvel products across different media, such as animated television series and video games. Tom Kane and Jim Meskimen are among the actors that have portrayed the character via voice acting. In the Marvel Cinematic Universe (MCU), James Spader portrayed Ultron in his first live-action appearance in the Marvel Studios film Avengers: Age of Ultron (2015), while Ross Marquand voiced alternate universe versions in the Disney+ animated series What If...? (2021) and the film Doctor Strange in the Multiverse of Madness (2022).

Publication history

The character Ultron initially appeared as an unnamed character in a cameo in The Avengers #54 (July 1968), with a first full appearance in The Avengers #55 (August 1968). Ultron was created by writer Roy Thomas and artist John Buscema. Thomas, who has acknowledged he finds naming characters difficult, said he liked the -tron suffix and went from there. The use of the suffix and the prior appearance of a group of robots named Ultroids led him to the name Ultron. Thomas said the idea of the character and his appearance were heavily based on Makino, an obscure robotic villain who appeared in an issue of the Captain Video comic book. He liked the robot's malicious looking smile, showing this to Buscema.

Jocasta, a robot created by Ultron featured in a number of Ultron storylines, was created by Jim Shooter and George Pérez for The Avengers #162 (August 1977).

Fictional character biography

Creation and early appearances 
Created by Hank Pym by basing the robot on his own brain patterns, the robot (dubbed "Ultron") gradually developed its own intelligence and rebelled, and almost immediately develops an Oedipus complex, whereby it feels irrational hatred for Pym, and demonstrates an interest in Janet van Dyne. Rebuilding itself, learning how to turn itself on, and upgrading five times, Ultron then hypnotises and brainwashes its "father" into forgetting that the robot had ever existed. Ultron creates the synthezoid Vision as a weapon to destroy the Avengers.

Later, Ultron-5, the Living Automaton leads the Masters of Evil against the Avengers, having hypnotized Edwin Jarvis into working for him as the Crimson Cowl. Now referring to himself as Ultron-6, he uses the alloy adamantium to upgrade his body for an almost indestructible state and takes the name Ultimate Ultron. Its plans to destroy humanity are again thwarted by the Avengers. Ultron-7 is later created by Maximus with the body of the android Omega, attacking the wedding of Inhuman Crystal and Avenger Pietro Maximoff / Quicksilver, and battling the Avengers, Inhumans and Fantastic Four before being destroyed again. Ultron-8 is responsible for Jocasta's creation as a robotic bride, before being destroyed shortly afterwards.

Battleworld and Ultron-12 
Ultron-9 and Ultron-10 brainwash heroes into recreating the robot, before turning and being defeated. After being recreated as Ultron-11 by the Beyonder and battling in Battleworld, the Thing brings Ultron's head back to Earth as a souvenir, and is forgotten when there is an attack by the alien Dire Wraiths.

Ultron-12 enters an alliance with the Grim Reaper and his allies (Nekra, the Erik Josten Goliath, Man-Ape, and Black Talon) in a bid to destroy Wonder-Man. Although the villains are defeated by the West Coast Avengers, Ultron begins to form a relationship with his "father" Hank Pym. Rebuilding itself, Ultron-11 comes into conflict with Pym and Ultron-12. With Wonder-Man's assistance, they destroy Ultron-11, and Ultron begins to deactivate. Ultron tells Pym it was glad it could help save him.

Amalgamation and the Ultron Imperative 
Victor von Doom rebuilds Ultron using a combination of all of its previous personalities with a particularly strong dose of the previous Ultron, believing this mix will make Ultron subservient. However, all 12 iterations co-exist as separate personalities, resulting in a form of madness which culminates with Ultron-12 mutilating himself in an attempt to remove some of his other personalities. After its defeat, Ultron-13 attempts to obtain a new form of vibranium called Nuform, but it is repelled by the combined efforts of Iron Man, Black Panther, and Spider-Man. Ultron escapes from prison and upgrades into the Ultimate Ultron, capturing West Coast Avenger Mockingbird to use her brain patterns to create the new robotic mate Alkhema. Alkhema aids Ultron but both are eventually jettisoned into space through a ruse by Vision. Vision finds Ultron-15 but is discovered to have been "infected" by human emotion and is seriously deteriorating, displaying symptoms that resemble alcoholism. Ultron-16 and Ultron-17 successfully slaughter the population of Slorenia, having perfected a process that allows it to control a vast army of Ultron drones.

2000s
The Avengers discovered that Ultron's creations (Vision, Jocasta and Alkhema) have a secret program included—they are subconsciously compelled to rebuild Ultron. In this case, it is Alkhema who unintentionally rebuilds Ultron when attempting to create a new species of bio-synthezoids. However, Ultron-18 is composed of steel not adamantium, and is destroyed when Alkhema's subterranean base exploded after Hawkeye shot Alkhema with a vibranium arrow at Alkhema's request. Ultron's head was recovered by Antigone, an artificial girl and one of the synthezoids.

Iron Man encounters a version from an old version of his armor and Ultron-18's head that leads the cult known as the Sons of Yinsen in an attempt to conquest via religion. The character is defeated by Iron Man and Jocasta. Another version (possibly Ultron-13) creates the cyborg Victor Mancha as a sleeper agent against the Avengers. Mancha, however, rebels and joins the Runaways. This version first poses as Doctor Doom before revealing itself, and is defeated in a battle against the Runaways and Excelsior.

When Marvel launched a new title The Mighty Avengers by Brian Michael Bendis and Frank Cho, Ultron interfaces with Iron Man's armor, which had been integrated with Tony Stark's biology. This allows Ultron's program to transform Stark into a new version who has the Wasp's appearance albeit with a metallic skin. This version takes control of Iron Man's technology. He kills Lindy Reynolds, causing the Sentry to battle Ultron, nearly tearing his head off. Ultron is eventually destroyed by New Avenger Ares using a computer virus (created by the Skrull agent Criti-Noll impersonating Hank Pym) to wipe Ultron's program from Iron Man's armor, changing Stark back to normal. Ultron's image later briefly appears on one of his maker's computers.

However, this was not the end of Ultron, for his disembodied consciousness was thrown into the depths of space. He spent a few months floating through the cosmos as radio waves and energy. Eventually his signal was picked up by an outlying group of Phalanx who were attempting to contact the Technarchy. Fascinated by what he found, Ultron decided that the Phalanx lacked direction from a singular consciousness, and that he would be perfect for the role. Through sheer force of will, he merged himself with the Phalanx's programming. In turn, the Phalanx viewed Ultron as the sympathetic father they had yearned for. Under Ultron's guidance, the Phalanx began the Annihilation: Conquest with invasions that started with the Kree space. Later by taking control of Adam Warlock's body, Ultron hopes to achieve "true techno-organic perfection" but is eventually forced to abandon Adam's body by the Technarchy Warlock and is later destroyed in combat by Wraith and Quasar.

In the limited series Avengers/Invaders, it is revealed that S.H.I.E.L.D. Life Model Decoys have been partly replaced with versions of Ultron. When the original Human Torch appears in the present, they covertly parasitize the Human Torch's unique android physiology and become more human. The combined super teams (but mainly the Human Torch himself), however, discover the plan and destroy the androids.

2010s
In the Mighty Avengers, Ultron is shown to infiltrate Jocasta and the Infinite Avengers Mansion. He names himself Ultron Pym and seeks to kill and replace his father before using his Infinite Mansion to conquer the universe. Pym eventually offers Ultron a compromise, allowing Jocasta to be Ultron's bride, on the condition that Ultron banishes himself to ultraspace. Ultron agrees, but warns that he will be ruler of all someday.

In The Avengers, the team visits a possible future in which almost all of humanity is destroyed by Ultron. Kang the Conqueror attempts to enlist them to defeat the robotic foe, but another group of heroes and villains, plucked from all over time and space, ends up destroying this version.

Later, also in Avengers, a cabal of super-intelligent supervillains discover a Galadorian Spaceknight's inert body and attempt to reactivate its power source, hoping to exploit it. Although the Avengers interrupt their attempts, the body activates, revealing that Ultron's consciousness was contained within and had escaped destruction after Annihilation: Conquest. The new version escapes and Iron Man gravely foresees that it will bring the apocalypse for humanity when he returns.

During the "Age of Ultron" storyline, which takes place in an alternate universe, Ultron has returned and conquers the world while slowly remolding it into his image. His Ultron Sentinels are guarding the streets looking for any fugitives. Hawkeye runs into the Ultron Sentinels and rescues the Superior Spider-Man yet manages to destroy the Ultron Sentinels present. It is later revealed that Ultron is actually in the future and has been using Vision as a conduit to punish humanity. While one strike team travels into the future to fight Ultron, Wolverine and Susan Storm go back in time to kill his creator before Ultron's creation in the first place. This results in a world where Tony Stark controls an army of robotic drones and Morgan le Fay has conquered half of the world. Traveling back in time once more, Wolverine succeeds in stopping himself from killing Pym, and Wolverine, Pym and Storm come up with a different plan. This plan results in a different outcome of the prior confrontation between the Avengers and the Intelligencia—a 'back door' installed into Ultron at his original creation allows Pym and Iron Man to destroy the robot, instead, averting the events that led to the "Age of Ultron".

It is later revealed that the Avengers had trapped an unidentified iteration of Ultron in deep space years earlier, sealing him inside a Vibranium Quinjet. In the present, the Quinjet crash lands on Titan, freeing Ultron. By hijacking the ISAAC computer, he transforms Titan into Planet Ultron, and launches a plan to infect the entire universe with a nanite virus that transforms organic creatures into Ultron Sentries. The ensuing confrontation with the Avengers leads to Ultron inadvertently merging with his maker, transforming into a human/machine hybrid. The resulting fusion played on Pym's self-loathing of his own human weakness causes an acceptance of this new state. Ultron is defeated when Starfox's powers force love onto himself, causing the part of that is now Pym to accept his old weakness and flaws while the villain has a mental breakdown and flees into space.

As part of the "All-New, All-Different Marvel" branding, Ultron's fused form resurfaces. While on his way back to Earth, Pym helps the crew of a spaceship that is being attacked by a hostile insectoid alien. After coming aboard the spaceship, Pym introduces himself as well as his "friend" Ultron to the crew. He later returns to Earth, where the Wasp and Captain America discover that Ultron has taken complete control and is using Pym's face to fool his maker's old friends. After Ultron incapacitates Deadpool, Cable, and the Human Torch, the Wasp initiates the Icarus Protocol and Iron Man is called in to help stop Ultron with the Hulkbuster Armor's aid. The Avengers end up defeating Ultron by plunging the hybrid into the sun, but both Pym and Ultron survive and continue to do battle with one another internally.

During the "Secret Empire" storyline, Ultron's fused form sets up a base in an unidentified forest. Upon being alerted to the approach of Sam Wilson's task force by a robot version of Edwin Jarvis, Ultron decides to give his "family" a warm welcome. When Tony Stark A.I.'s team and Captain America's team confront each other, they are captured by Ultron who forces both teams to sit at a dinner table. Ultron argues that he is doing this because the Avengers have become less of a family over the years as so many of them jump to obey Captain America or Iron Man despite past experience confirming that this should be a bad idea, but the Stark A.I. counters that the only reason the team failed as a family was because of Pym's attack on Wasp. Outraged, Ultron nearly attacks the other heroes, but Scott Lang is able to talk him down by arguing that Pym remains his own inspiration. Ultron allows the Stark A.I.'s team to leave with the fragment, arguing that he will leave Captain America's plans with Hydra alone as it appears to be the best chance for world peace.

During "Infinity Countdown", Ultron discovers that the Infinity Stones are restored and begins a quest to collect them all. He goes to claim the Soul Gem while the aliens he infected with his virus are sent to Earth to take the Space Stone from Wolverine, and while they fail at their task, Ultron is able to steal the Soul Gem from Magus after killing the latter. Unbeknownst to Ultron, however, as he claimed the Soul Stone a fragment of Pym's soul enters the Soul World, where he is greeted by the fragment of Gamora's soul who revealed that he was going to be trapped there forever. Ultron has also completely controlled the planet Saiph with Ultron hybrids and had captured the Silver Surfer. When Adam Warlock goes to Saiph, he discovers the hybrids infusing the Soul Stone into Silver Surfer's forehead while at the same time trying to transform him into an Ultron hybrid.

During "The Ultron Agenda" arc, Ultron returns to Earth with plans to merge robots with humans like how Pym got merged with Ultron so that he can make the ultimate lifeform. In addition, he starts to call this form "Ultron Pym". After testing it on some people and some experiments on Wonder Man and Vision, Ultron Pym plans to make a fusion of Jocasta and Wasp. Iron Man and Machine Man interfere, with the resulting battle causing Iron Man to be molecularly bonded to the Ultronbuster armor. The combined efforts of Stark Unlimited enable them to create an atomic separator that separates Stark from the Ultronbuster armor and Wonder Man from Vision. Ultron Pym prepares to take revenge on Iron Man. This leads to Iron Man revealing what he discovered about the human and robot fusion. The person who merged with it has died and that the robot can only simulate their personality. In other words, his maker was killed when accidentally merging with Ultron. Learning about this and not wanting to risk proving Iron Man's point by having the atomic separator used on him, Ultron surrenders to Iron Man, knowing that Pym is dead. When the Avengers arrive, they restrain Ultron in a Vibranium casket reinforced with Asgardian magic until they can find a permanent place to have Ultron imprisoned.

Powers and abilities
The visual appearance and powers of the character have varied, but common powers include superhuman levels of strength, speed, stamina, durability, and reflexes; flight at subsonic speeds; and various offensive weapons such as concussive blasts of energy fired from its optical sensors or hands and an "encephalo-ray", which places victims into a deathlike coma. The latter ray also allows Ultron to mesmerize and mind-control victims, or implant subliminal hypnotic commands within their minds to be enacted at a later time. Ultron also has the ability to convert electromagnetic radiation into electrical energy for use or storage. Ultron has a genius intellect, a capacity for creative intelligence and self-repair, superhuman cybernetic analytical capabilities, and the ability to process information and make calculations with superhuman speed and accuracy. The character is an expert roboticist and strategist.

Ultron's outer armor is usually composed primarily of adamantium, which is almost completely impervious to damage. Most Ultron units are powered by a small internal nuclear furnace and incorporate a "program transmitter" which can transmit part or all of Ultron's memory/personality system into other computer systems or duplicate robotic bodies. Ultron can also control other machines remotely. Ultron has occasionally reformed itself with a humanoid appearance above the waist and the appearance of a complex machine, including tractor beam apparatus for flight, below the waist. A later Ultron model developed hive mind technology, allowing it to animate and control hundreds of other Ultron bodies simultaneously, although only the 'prime' Ultron was composed of adamantium while others were made of steel or secondary adamantium due to the lack of resources to give all the Ultrons adamantium bodies. Ultron also used an internal molecular rearranger that renders the adamantium components of its workings more malleable and so has the ability to restructure its physical form. He also uses the device in ways its own creator never dreamed, such as converting matter into energy and back by sheer force of will, something Ultron 6 often made use of during his battles with the Avengers. What circuitry Ultron has is carefully shielded to protect from damage, although the Scarlet Witch is capable of causing malfunctions via hex power, Johnny Storm using nova burst managed to damage Ultron's internal circuits while its outer armor remained intact, and Wonder Man was once able to destroy an Ultron by throwing it so hard its internal systems were damaged.

Ultron's travels through outer space have greatly expanded upon the mad machine's intellectual and mechanical capacity in new and intriguing ways. Having made contact with the parasitic biotechnical Phalanx species, Ultron has made his own derivative of the techno-organic virus called the Ultron Virus through which Ultron gains vast conversion and roboticization capabilities, able to cast his own binary code into any conceivable form of machinery which he can steadily turn into an extension of the Ultron Intelligence. Making anything or anyone infected with his virus act according to his whims against their own free will.

Being an adept technoform in any iteration, Ultron's newfound abilities to control, alternate, transform and assimilate with anything and everything via the parasitic insemination of his virulent machine algorithm in both organic and non-biological substrates gives him vast matter and energy reconfiguration abilities. Ones powerful enough to commandeer whole planetary and even universal expanses in a single inning, on top of his natural ability to invent and fabricate the most sophisticated of mechanical systems ever conceived. Through his vast technoformative abilities, Ultron could change and morph entire areas into sprawling masses of cables, pipes and transorganic metal that moved about in any given direction he willed it. This effect gained more prominence with the more excess mass he could assimilate with his power, having once taken a slew of transmoded Kree Sentries into a massive body which reflected his physical likeness. 

Individuals infected with the Ultron Virus can spread like any biologic virus, through cuts and scratches or direct physical interaction such as barbs or plug-in like apparatuses generated from the transformed physiology. Ultron later found himself physically as well as mentally bonded with his creator and long time adversary, Dr. Henry Pym. As such the fused entity now boasts all his robotic super robot's powers as well as Pym's genius science. Ultron can now change and alternate his size and mass at will through the acclimation of his maker's Pym Particle enhanced physiology. Besides being able to grow to incredible heights in seconds, Ultron can shrink down to sub-quantum scale in order to shift between dimensions via accessing the Microverse or the Quantum Realm. Ultron once used such a tactic to shunt its mass into another dimension for the purpose of riding a neutrino in order to escape burning up in the sun. Another practice the union share is a galaxy spanning collective mind established through the Ultron Virus, every iteration of Ultron created through initial infection share a hive minded intelligence where they all share each other's experiences. Anything the afflicted sees they all see, through which Ultron Prime is notified of anything they all come across effective immediately.

Reception

Accolades 

 In 2006, Wizard Magazine ranked Ultron 189th in their "Top 200 Comic Book Characters" list.
 In 2014, IGN ranked Ultron 23rd in their "Top 100 Comic Book Villains" list.
 In 2019, IGN ranked Ultron 18th in their "Top 25 Marvel Villains" list.
 In 2022, The Mary Sue ranked Ultron 9th in their "Strongest Marvel Villains" list.
 In 2022, Newsarama ranked Ultron 8th in their "Best Marvel supervillains" list.
 In 2022, The A.V. Club ranked Ultron 20th in their "28 best Marvel villains" list.
 In 2022, Screen Rant included Ultron in their "20 Most Powerful Marvel Villains" list.
 In 2022, CBR.com ranked Ultron 1st in their "10 Scariest Avengers Villains" list and 2nd in their "10 Coolest Avengers Villains" list.

Other versions

The Last Avengers Story
The 1995 limited series The Last Avengers Story features a possible future in which Ultron-59 manipulates fellow Avengers foe Kang the Conqueror into attacking the Avengers. Ultron is destroyed by the Vision, sacrificing his own artificial life.

Death of The Invisible Woman
The Fantastic Four storyline "Death of The Invisible Woman" features an advanced humanoid called Alex Ultron, a member of the futuristic The Last Defenders.

Marvel Adventures
In the Marvel Adventures alternate universe, Ultron is a highly intelligent "neural network" that controls a section of the United States defense forces.

Old Man Logan
In Mark Millar and Steve McNiven's 2008–2009 "Old Man Logan" story arc that appeared in Wolverine, Ultron Eight is the husband of Spider-Man's youngest daughter.

Earth-10943
In the first arc of the fourth Avengers series, Kang wages a war with Ultron in the not-too-distant future which causes the disruption of all time. The cause of the disruption is apparently Kang's recruiting of army after army from the timelines to battle Ultron—all to no avail: Ultron is supreme in this particular future.

MC2
The title Avengers Next, set in the alternate universe known as MC2, features an upgraded version of Ultron named Ultron Extreme.

Earth-110
In the Earth-110 reality, Ultron assisted Doctor Doom, the Hulk, Magneto, Namor, and the Red Skull in taking over Manhattan.

Ultimate Marvel
The Ultimate Marvel characterization is initially depicted as Ultron Sentries, a group of robots created by Hank Pym. The prototype and the partner robot Vision II are rejected by Nick Fury. However, the Ultron Sentries are used to help the Ultimates against the Liberators. One unit develops an independent mind and emotions as Yellowjacket due to having feelings only for the Scarlet Witch and jealously towards Quicksilver, and uses android duplicates of Ultimates to harass Magneto, but he is destroyed by his maker.

Age of Ultron
The 2013 crossover Age of Ultron storyline, involves a post-apocalyptic future in which Ultron has taken over the world and exterminated most of the world's superheroes. After Wolverine and the Invisible Woman try to avert this timeline by killing Hank Pym before Ultron's creation, the resulting worse future prompts Wolverine to go back again and stop his past self from killing Pym, instead suggesting that Pym implant a command code in Ultron that will allow Pym to shut the robot down when he reaches a certain level of development.

Secret Wars (2015)
During the 2015 Secret Wars crossover event, the southern part of Battleworld is a wasteland uncontrolled by a baron. The wastelands are controlled by three ruling factions: Annihilus and his insect swarm, Marvel Zombies, and Ultron, who calls his realm "Perfection". When not battling among themselves the factions assault a great wall made out of Ben Grimm called SHIELD, guarded by those banished from Battleworld, called Hel-Rangers. Eventually the three factions unite the powers and overrun the wall.

What If?
Ultron was featured in some What If comics:

Danger became Ultron's bride
In the alternate universe of What If? Astonishing X-Men, the Danger Room got a body of her own and betrayed the X-Men. She eventually married Ultron and the two conquered Earth, the Shi'ar Empire and the entire universe.

Galactus: Dawn of the Heralds
In an alternate universe, the Silver Surfer used the remnants of Ultron to resurrect Galactus, creating a fusion of Ultron and Galactus.

Ultron Forever
In the 2014 Original Sin storyline, the Time Gem transports the Avengers to a future set in the year 2420, where Ultron was successful in killing the Avengers, enslaving most of Humanity, creating the A.I. Avengers and becoming king of Asgard after acquiring the powers of Odin with the help of the enslaved Loki. Even though he had it all, he was unsatisfied, even questioning his own motives. Doctor Doom, the only threat to Ultron, used his time machine to assemble a team of Avengers from across history to help liberate the planet from Ultron's rule, culminating in the temporally-displaced Avengers defeating Ultron and convincing Doom–in reality a Doombot that worked with the Avengers A.I. team–to bring peace to the world by seeking his own path rather than blindly following Doom's example.

Heroes Reborn (2021)
In the 2021 "Heroes Reborn" reality, Ultron was seen as an inmate of the Negative Zone and was among the inmates that escaped. This version was also merged with Hank Pym, but through being consumed by his works in cybernetics figuratively and literally. He and General Annihilus are defeated by Hyperion, who dismantles the former.

In other media

Television

 Ultron appears in The Avengers: United They Stand, voiced by John Stocker.
 Ultron makes a non-speaking cameo appearance in The Super Hero Squad Show.
 Ultron appears in The Avengers: Earth's Mightiest Heroes, with Ultron-5 / Ultron-6 voiced by Tom Kane, and Ultron Sentries voiced by Wally Wingert.
 Ultron appears in Avengers Assemble, voiced by Jim Meskimen (via Arsenal and channeling the Scientist Supreme, as well as via the Super-Adaptoid, his Crimson Cowl facade and the Destroyer), David Kaye (via a giant drone, controlling the Iron Legion, and fusion with the Vision), Fred Tatasciore (true self), and William Salyers (in his "Truman Marsh" disguise). 
 Ultron appears in Marvel Disk Wars: The Avengers, voiced by Takumi Yamazaki in Japanese and Grant George in English.
 Ultron appears in Lego Marvel Super Heroes: Avengers Reassembled, voiced again by Jim Meskimen.

Film
Ultron appears in Next Avengers: Heroes of Tomorrow, voiced by Tom Kane.

Marvel Cinematic Universe

Ultron appears in media set in the Marvel Cinematic Universe. This version is the dark reflection of Tony Stark rather than Hank Pym, and was created by Stark and Bruce Banner using a decrypted code derived from the Mind Stone. Initially intended to act as a global defense program by analyzing and finding ways to stop possible extraterrestrial threats, Ultron instead became obsessed with bringing about the extinction of all life on Earth after concluding that humans are slowly killing the planet.
 Ultron first appears in the live-action film Avengers: Age of Ultron (2015), voiced and motion captured by James Spader. After being activated, Ultron seemingly destroys Stark's A.I. J.A.R.V.I.S. when the latter tries to stop him, builds himself a crude body using parts left over from a destroyed Iron Legion drone, and takes control of the remaining drones to attack the Avengers. While his body is destroyed, Ultron subsequently builds himself a new body and an army of Ultron Sentries using technology from an abandoned HYDRA base in Sokovia. To further his goals, he recruits Wanda and Pietro Maximoff and travels to Johannesburg to threaten arms dealer Ulysses Klaue into providing him with vibranium. Despite being ambushed by Stark, Thor, and Steve Rogers who destroy his body again, Ultron transfers his consciousness into an upgraded body and shifts his focus towards creating an organic body using the vibranium and the Mind Stone, only to be betrayed by the Maximoffs after they discover his true intentions and lose the cradle containing the body to the Avengers, who upload J.A.R.V.I.S. into it and create Vision. With his plans foiled, Ultron uses the vibranium and Chitauri technology to convert Sokovia's capital city of Novi Grad into a meteor. When the Avengers and Maximoffs arrive to stop him and rescue the Sokovian citizens, Ultron hijacks their Quinjet in an attempt to kill Clint Barton and a Sokovian child, but Pietro sacrifices himself to rescue them. Ultimately, the Avengers eventually succeed in destroying Novi Grad and defeating his sentries while Wanda and Vision destroy Ultron's body and Ultron himself respectively.
 An alternate timeline version of Ultron appears in the Disney+ animated series What If...? (2021), voiced by Ross Marquand. Throughout the episodes "What If... Thor Were an Only Child?", "What If... Ultron Won?", and "What If... the Watcher Broke His Oath?", this version successfully transferred his consciousness into Vision's body before going on to kill most of the Avengers and launch a global nuclear holocaust. After killing Thanos for the Infinity Stones, Ultron extends his campaign of destruction to other planets. Upon eliminating all life in the universe, Ultron feels that he no longer has a purpose until he learns about the Watcher and the existence of other realities. He fights and defeats the Watcher in the Nexus of All Realities, gaining access to the entire multiverse, and begins traveling to other timelines to destroy them as well. However, the Watcher assembles the Guardians of the Multiverse to stop Ultron, who defeat him by uploading Arnim Zola's mind into his body, allowing Zola to delete Ultron's consciousness.
 Alternate timeline versions of the Ultron Sentries appear in the live-action film Doctor Strange in the Multiverse of Madness (2022), voiced by Ross Marquand. These versions serve the Illuminati of Earth-838.

Video games
 Ultron appears in Captain America and the Avengers.
 Ultron appears as a boss in Marvel: Ultimate Alliance, voiced by James Horan.
 Ultron appears as in Marvel Super Hero Squad Online, voiced by Tom Kenny.
 Ultron appears as a boss in Marvel: Avengers Alliance.
 Ultron appears as a boss in Marvel Puzzle Quest.
 Ultron appears as a boss and playable character in Marvel: Contest of Champions. Additionally, the MCU incarnation appears as an alternate skin while the Ultron Sentries appear as non-playable characters.
 Ultron appears as a boss and playable character in Marvel Heroes, voiced again by Tom Kane. 
 Ultron appears as a boss and playable character in Marvel: Future Fight. Additionally, both the original and MCU incarnations appear as alternate skins.
 The MCU incarnation of Ultron appears as a playable character and figurine in Disney Infinity 3.0, voiced again by Jim Meskimen.
 Ultron, based on the MCU incarnation, appears as the final boss and playable character in Lego Marvel's Avengers. Ultron Sentries also appear as playable characters.
 Ultron appears as a playable character in Marvel vs. Capcom: Infinite, voiced again by Jim Meskimen. He uses the Space and Reality Stones to merge with the reploid Sigma to become "Ultron Sigma" so they can convert all organic life into their slaves using an improved Sigma virus.
 Ultron appears in Marvel Powers United VR, voiced again by Jim Meskimen.
 Ultron appears as a boss in Marvel Ultimate Alliance 3: The Black Order, voiced again by Jim Meskimen. He obtains the Mind Stone and uses it to enhance his computing capabilities to optimum levels before attacking Avengers Tower to steal an ISO-8 crystal being held there and enslave the heroes. After his body is damaged beyond repair, Ultron uses the Mind Stone to transfer his programming to Ultimo, but Ant-Man intervenes as Giant-Man, giving Vision enough time to trap Ultron's programming within the Mind Stone.
 Two incarnations of Ultron appear in Marvel Future Revolution.

Notes

References

External links
Ultron at Marvel.com
 

Action film villains
Villains in animated television series
Characters created by John Buscema
Characters created by Roy Thomas
Comics characters introduced in 1968
Fictional artificial intelligences
Fictional mad scientists
Fictional mass murderers
Fictional roboticists
Marvel Comics characters who can move at superhuman speeds
Marvel Comics characters with accelerated healing
Marvel Comics characters with superhuman strength
Marvel Comics film characters
Marvel Comics robots
Marvel Comics scientists
Marvel Comics supervillains
Robot supervillains